Eaton Reservoir also called Eaton Brook Reservoir is a man-made lake located by Erieville, New York. Fish species present in the lake include pumpkinseed sunfish, walleye, smallmouth bass, yellow perch, bluegill, pickerel, rock bass, rainbow trout, and largemouth bass.

References

Lakes of New York (state)
Lakes of Madison County, New York